Jeff Lieberman (born October 16, 1947) is an American film director and screenwriter, known for his cult horror and thriller films Squirm (1976), Blue Sunshine (1978) and Just Before Dawn (1981).

Biography
Jeff Lieberman was born in 1947 in the Brooklyn borough of New York City. He made his feature film debut as the writer and director of the nature horror film Squirm (1976), about earthworms inundating a small Southern town and wreaking havoc. His following film, Blue Sunshine (1978), followed a series of murders in Los Angeles, connected to the killers' use of a certain strain of LSD. Blue Sunshine screened at the Cannes Film Festival, as well as the London Film Festival and Edinburgh International Film Festival. In 1981, Lieberman wrote and directed the slasher film Just Before Dawn, about a group of campers stalked by a killer in the backwoods of Oregon.

In 1988, Lieberman wrote and directed Remote Control, a science fiction film following a video store clerk who discovers a videotape circulating in his store is brainwashing its viewers. He subsequently wrote the screenplay for The NeverEnding Story III (1994). He later wrote and directed the satirical comedy horror film Satan's Little Helper (2004).

Filmography
As director

As screenwriter

References

Sources

External links

1947 births
Horror film directors
Film directors from New York City
People from Brooklyn
Screenwriters from New York (state)
Living people